Kolhapur Institute of Technology's College of Engineering (an autonomous institute established in May 1983) popularly known as (KIT College of Engineering), Kolhapur, Maharashtra, was granted autonomous status by UGC and AICTE New Delhi.

Spread over 30 acres, the natural form of the landscape has been preserved. The campus houses the main building, hostels for boys and girls, workshops with a built-up area of around 23,500 sq. m. and an innovative waste recycling system, windmills, gardens dotted with solar powered lamps and also popular for CSE placements.

Facilities
The college has a campus of  500 m away from National Highway 48. The campus has a basketball court, a cricket ground, and a gymnasium.

Components of the college:
 Central Library
 Department of Computer Science & Engineering
 Department of Environmental Engineering
 Department of Electrical Engineering
 Department of Electronics & Telecommunication
 Department of Civil Engineering
 Department of Biotechnology Engineering
 Department of Mechanical Engineering
 KIT's Institute of Management Education & Research
 Boys hostel
 Girls hostel
 Moodle

The campus architecture gives a blend of old and modern. The main building built in stone masonry has green technologies like a waste recycling system, windmills, gardens dotted with solar powered lamps and is an Energy Park. The campus is surrounded by lush greenery.

The campus has classrooms, drawing halls, laboratories, seminar halls, library, canteen, an open-air auditorium, play ground and a gym.

Annual events include Pioneer (a national level paper presentation competition), and the annual social gathering.

References 

https://www.kitcoek.in/

Engineering colleges in Maharashtra
Shivaji University
Kolhapur district
Educational institutions established in 1983
1983 establishments in Kerala